Goffs-Churchgate Academy is a secondary school with academy status located in Cheshunt, Hertfordshire, England with around 300 students.

History 
Cheshunt Grammar School was built in 1935 in Windmill Lane. Over the years many newer buildings were added around the original building. In 1988 the County Council closed the nearby Bishopslea School in College Road, and distributed the pupils around the other local schools, although Cheshunt Grammar School took most of the pupils and some teachers. In 1990, it was decided to move the entire school to the old Bishopslea School site in College Road.

The new school was called Cheshunt School and opened in September 1992. The old Grammar School was demolished and became a housing estate, despite the County Council's explicit prior assurances during a consultation period with local residents that the site would not be used for housing and that it would instead be put to use for the local community, before the school was closed, with street names reflecting the names of past people at the school. Until 2005, the old outdoor pool remained disused and undeveloped, but has since been turned into flats. The school was previously known as Cheshunt School up until 2017 when it merged with Goffs School.

Notable former pupils 

 Tim Brown, Chief Executive since 2014 of Jersey Post, and Chief Executive from 2008 to 2011 of the Postal Services Commission
 Matt King, comedian, actor, played Super Hans in Peep Show
 Ryan Mason, footballer

Cheshunt Grammar School 
 Prof John Brooks, Vice-Chancellor from 2005 to 2015 of Manchester Metropolitan University and from 1998 to 2005 of the University of Wolverhampton
 Geoffrey Hodgson, academic
 Peter Moules and Tommy Moeller (singer) from Unit 4 + 2
 Robin Plummer Libyan Hostage 1984–85
 Heather Tomlinson, Director of Education from 2001 to 2004 for Nottinghamshire
 Benjamin Travers FRS, surgeon
 Sir David Watson (although later attended Eton), academic, Professor of Higher Education Management from 2005 at the UCL Institute of Education, Vice-Chancellor from 1992 to 2005 of the University of Brighton, and Director from 1990 to 1992 of Brighton Polytechnic
 Andy Parker, drummer and founding member of legendary British rock band UFO

Cheshunt Secondary Modern School 
 John Dalton, bass guitarist in The Kinks (replacing Pete Quaife in 1969)
 Bob Henrit, musician with Unit 4 + 2 and The Kinks
 Buster Meikle and Brian Parker, from 1960s group Unit 4 + 2
 Cliff Richard (Harry Webb), pop singer

References 

Secondary schools in Hertfordshire
Academies in Hertfordshire